Dominic Gerard Francis Eagleton West (born 15 October 1969) is an English actor, director and musician. He is best known for playing Jimmy McNulty in HBO's The Wire (2002–2008), Noah Solloway in Showtime's The Affair (2014–2019), the latter of which earned him a Golden Globe Award for Best Actor – Television Series Drama nomination, Ebenezer Scrooge’s nephew Fred in A Christmas Carol (1999, with Patrick Stewart as Scrooge), and Charles, Prince of Wales, in the Netflix drama The Crown (2022–present).

West made his television debut in 1998 BBC medical drama Out of Hours before appearing in the television films A Christmas Carol (1999), and Nicholas Nickleby (2001). His breakthrough came with the role of Detective Jimmy McNulty in the HBO series The Wire (2002–2008). He then starred in BBC series The Hour (2011–2012) earning a Golden Globe Award nomination. He received a BAFTA Award for his performance as the serial killer Fred West in the ITV drama Appropriate Adult (2011) and a nomination for his portrayal as Richard Burton in BBC Four's Burton & Taylor (2013). He played Jean Valjean in the 2018 BBC miniseries Les Misérables. He has since starred in the Netflix series Stateless (2020), and the Amazon Studios The Pursuit of Love (2021). West is currently playing the role of Dr Chris Cox in the Sky One series Brassic (2019–present).

His film debut came with his portrayal of Henry, Earl of Richmond in Ian McKellen's adaptation of Richard III (1995). He has since appeared in Chicago (2002), Mona Lisa Smile (2003), 300 (2007), Punisher: War Zone (2008), John Carter (2012), Pride (2014), Testament of Youth (2014), Money Monster (2016), Genius (2016), The Square (2017), Tomb Raider (2018), Colette (2018), and Downton Abbey: A New Era (2022).

Early life
Dominic Gerard Francis Eagleton West was born on 15 October 1969 in Sheffield, West Riding of Yorkshire. He is the sixth of seven siblings (five girls and two boys) born into a family of Irish descent; his maternal grandparents were born in Ireland, while his paternal grandmother was Irish-American. His mother, Pauline Mary (née Cleary), was an actress, and his father, Thomas George Eagleton West, owned a plastics factory. He is the first cousin once removed of American politician Thomas Eagleton. West attended Eton College, and then following a gap year during which he spent four months working as a cattle herder in Argentina, he studied English literature at Trinity College Dublin, graduating in 1993. He graduated from the Guildhall School of Music and Drama in 1995.

Career

Film and television
West's screen appearances include True Blue, Chicago, Richard III, and Mona Lisa Smile. His most notable television role has been starring in The Wire as Baltimore police detective Jimmy McNulty. West was praised for the accuracy of his character's American accent. His debut as a director was while being on The Wire; he directed the episode "Took" (2008). West starred as Lysander in the 1999 film version of William Shakespeare's A Midsummer Night's Dream.  That same year, he appeared as Fred in A Christmas Carol. In feature films, he portrayed the heavy metal guitarist Kirk Cuddy in the 2001 film Rock Star. West played Fred Casely in the 2002 film Chicago.

In 2006 West played the Spartan politician Theron in 300 and made a guest appearance as an actor in a sketch in The Catherine Tate Show, alongside "Frankie Howerd impressionist". In 2007 he played Detective Poppil in Hannibal Rising. West played the disfigured supervillain Jigsaw in the 2008 film Marvel's Punisher: War Zone. In 2010 he had a role as General Virilus in Neil Marshall's adventure thriller Centurion. West starred in the UK ghost film, The Awakening. West has done other work on TV and radio. He appeared in the role of Oliver Cromwell in the Channel 4 series The Devil's Whore. He also performed as "Dr. West", the opening track on Eminem's 2009 album Relapse, as a doctor discharging Eminem from a rehab facility. West played the part over the phone in January 2009 while Eminem was recording it in a Miami studio.

In December 2009, West starred as Hank in a radio adaptation of Eugene O'Neill's play The Hairy Ape for BBC Radio 3, was a guest presenter on the BBC show Have I Got News for You, and ended the year alongside Joan Rivers and Sarah Jessica Parker with an appearance on Graham Norton's New Year's Eve Show. In 2011, West appeared as a news presenter on the BBC period drama series The Hour. He also played serial killer Fred West in the ITV two-part series Appropriate Adult, giving a performance that the serial killer's daughter described as capturing the "evil essence of [Fred West] – his character, his mannerisms, even his gait."

In 2012, West was offered the role of Mance Rayder in the HBO fantasy series Game of Thrones, but turned it down due to the amount of time he would have to spend away from his family. He played gay activist Jonathan Blake in the 2014 film Pride about the 1984–1985 UK miners' strike. West starred as Noah Solloway on Showtime's series The Affair, which premiered October 2014. The series was renewed for a fifth season in 2018.

In 2018 it was reported that West was represented by Tavistock Wood Management. That year he appeared in Colette as the eponymous writer's husband, Willy. In 2019, West played the role of Jean Valjean in the BBC's adaptation of Victor Hugo's novel Les Misérables. Also in 2019, West appeared in Sky One's series Brassic, in the recurring role of Dr. Chris Cox. In October 2020, West entered negotiations to play Charles, Prince of Wales in the final two seasons of The Crown. His casting was confirmed in April 2021. That same month, West joined the cast of the 2022 film Downton Abbey: A New Era.

Theatre
As a theatre actor, West has played Edward in Harley Granville Barker's The Voysey Inheritance directed by Peter Gill at the Royal National Theatre in 2006. Around 2009, he starred at London's Donmar Warehouse as the protagonist in Helen Edmundson's adaptation of Pedro Calderón de la Barca's existential drama Life Is a Dream, for which he received glowing reviews.

He took the title role in Simon Gray's classic comedy, Butley, playing at the Duchess Theatre in London from 1 June 2011. In the September he returned to his native Sheffield to play Iago to his former Wire co-star Clarke Peters's Othello at the Crucible Theatre.

In September to October 2012, he starred in Jez Butterworth's The River at the Royal Court Theatre in London with Miranda Raison and Laura Donnelly.

From mid December 2012 to January 2013, West starred as Henry Higgins in My Fair Lady at the Crucible Theatre in Sheffield.

In 2015–16, he starred alongside Janet McTeer in Les Liaisons Dangereuses at the Donmar Warehouse in London.

Advertising
In 2009, West starred in a series of online films known as "The Carte Noire Readers". Made to promote French coffee brand Carte Noire, they consist of actors reading love scenes from a selection of sources and acting through the commitment of justice. West reads extracts from Pride and Prejudice by Jane Austen; Lady Chatterley's Lover by D.H. Lawrence; High Fidelity by Nick Hornby; The Age of Innocence by Edith Wharton; Life Class by Pat Barker; The Moment You Were Gone by Nicci Gerrard; and Something Childish But Very Natural by Katherine Mansfield.

Charity
West is a supporter of care charity Helen's Trust in response to their assistance to his mother prior to her death.

He led Team Canada/Australia for Walking With The Wounded, a fundraising event for wounded soldiers. He trekked to the South Pole against Team UK (led by Prince Harry) and Team America (led by Alexander Skarsgård). A few days into the trek, it was decided that the competition part of the race would be cancelled due to hazardous terrain and weather conditions, so the teams combined forces and continued. Alongside Harry, Skarsgård and several wounded soldiers, West successfully made it to the South Pole on 13 December 2013.

Personal life
In 1999, West and his girlfriend, Polly Astor, had a daughter named Martha, who became an actress. West later rekindled his romance with Catherine FitzGerald, whom he had dated at university. The two married in Glin, County Limerick on 26 June 2010, and have four children: Dora, Senan (who made his screen debut alongside his father in The Crown), Francis, and Christabel.

Politics
In August 2014, West was one of 200 public figures who were signatories to a letter to The Guardian expressing their hope that Scotland would vote to remain part of the United Kingdom in September's referendum on that issue.

Following Donald Trump's criticism of Baltimore, Maryland in July 2019, West asked "What would a lonely, hysterical neurotic who uses hand cleanser all day understand about a vibrant community like Baltimore?"

Honours
In November 2010, West was awarded an honorary degree for services to the Arts by Sheffield Hallam University. 
In July 2018, he received an honorary doctorate from the University of Sheffield.

Filmography

Film

Television

Awards and nominations

References

External links

 

1969 births
Living people
20th-century English male actors
21st-century English male actors
Alumni of the Guildhall School of Music and Drama
Alumni of Trinity College Dublin
Audiobook narrators
Best Actor BAFTA Award (television) winners
English male film actors
English male Shakespearean actors
English male stage actors
English male television actors
English male voice actors
English people of American descent
English people of Irish descent
English television directors
Male actors from Sheffield
Outstanding Performance by a Cast in a Motion Picture Screen Actors Guild Award winners
People educated at Eton College
People associated with the University of Sheffield
People associated with Sheffield Hallam University